L2, L2, L02, L II, L.2 or L-2 may refer to:

Astronomy
 L2 point, second Lagrangian point in a two body orbiting system
 L2 Puppis, star which is also known as HD 56096
 Advanced Telescope for High Energy Astrophysics, a proposed X-ray telescope

Biology 
 Haplogroup L2 (mtDNA) in human genetics
 ATC code L02 Endocrine therapy, a subgroup of the Anatomical Therapeutic Chemical Classification System
 the second lumbar vertebrae of the vertebral column in human anatomy
 the second larval stage in the Caenorhabditis elegans worm development

Computing
 L2 cache, the Level-2 CPU cache in a computer
 Layer 2 of the OSI model, in computer networking
 L2 (operating system), or Liedtke 2 (a.k.a. EUMEL/ELAN), a persistent microkernel operating system developed by German computer scientist Jochen Liedtke
 L2 (programming language)
 ISO/IEC 8859-2 (Latin-2), an 8-bit character encoding

Entertainment 
 L2 (music group), an American pop duo
 Leprechaun 2, 1994 film
 Lineage II, a MMO game
 Lumines II, a puzzle game

Mathematics
 The L2 space of square-integrable functions
 L2 norm
 The ℓ2 space of square-summable sequences
 L2 cohomology, a cohomology theory for smooth non-compact manifolds with Riemannian metric

Technology and weapons 
 a variety of low-alloy special purpose steel
 a L-carrier cable system developed by AT&T
 a series of fragmentation hand grenades used by the British armed forces (American M61 copies), before being replaced by the L109 grenade
 the L designation given to the Sterling submachine gun in the British armed forces
 a frequency used in GPS satellite navigation signals, see GPS signals, a newer version is the L2C frequency

Transportation

Aircraft
 LZ 18 (L 2), a short-lived 1913 German airship (Imperial Navy designation: L 2)
 Arado L II, a 1929 German model of high-wing sporting monoplane
 ASJA L2, a pair of 1932 Swedish trainer biplanes
 Lawson L-2, a 1920 American biplane airliner
 Macchi L.2, an Italian model of biplane flying boat
 L-2 Grasshopper, an American Taylorcraft model used in WWII
 PZL Ł.2, a 1929 Polish model of liaison aircraft

Aviation
 Junkers L2, an engine model; precursor to the Junkers L5
 Lynden Air Cargo, Alaskan airline (IATA code: L2)
 Walker County Airport (or Bevill Field), Alabama, U.S. (former FAA LID: L02)

Rail locomotives
 Chesapeake and Ohio Class L-2 and L-2a, an American 4-6-4 "Hudson" type steam locomotives model
 Milwaukee Road class L2, an American 2-8-2 "Mikado" type steam locomotive
 SP&S Class L-2, an 1881 steam locomotives class
 LNER Class L2, a 1925 class of 2-6-4Ts

Other modes of transport
 L2 (New York City bus), a temporary bus route in New York City, U.S.
 The Randwick branch of the CBD and South East Light Rail in Sydney, Australia, numbered L2

Other uses 
 Second language (L2), a non-native, acquired tongue of an individual
 L², a Flemish political youth organization
 L-2 visa, a U.S. travel document for dependents of temporary workers
 a class of FM radio broadcasting in North America
 Ligue 2, a French association football league
 L2 Inc, an Americanmarket research company

See also
 2L (disambiguation)
 LII (disambiguation)
 Level 2 (disambiguation)